The Aishiyeh massacre was a massacre in 1976 in Aishiya, Lebanon, of more than 70 Lebanese Christian civilians, including at least 7 under the age of 16, by the Syrian backed Palestinian factions Fatah and Saika during the Lebanese Civil War. Four people were reported to be executed and one was burned alive. The village was depopulated and used as Palestine Liberation Organization base of operation. The Online Encyclopedia of Mass Violence estimated that at least 100 people were injured in the attack.

The town was attacked again by Saika on November 5, 1977, killing 41 people.

See also
Damour massacre
Mountain War (Lebanon)

References

Conflicts in 1976
1976 in Lebanon
Mass murder in 1976
Massacres in 1976
Massacres of the Lebanese Civil War
Palestinian terrorism
October 1976 events in Asia
Massacres of Christians
Jezzine District
1976 murders in Lebanon